This is a list of defunct airlines of Puerto Rico.

See also
 List of airlines of Puerto Rico
 List of airports in Puerto Rico

References

External links
 Puerto Rico. Airline History. Retrieved 2 November 2021. Archived.

Puerto Rico
Airlines